Pegram v. Herdrich, 530 U.S. 211 (2000), was a United States Supreme Court case that held that the Employee Retirement Income Security Act of 1974 does not provide a remedy for coverage determinations by health maintenance organizations. The case is important because by excluding suits involving coverage determinations from the Act, it does not pre-empt state law remedies.

References

External links
 

United States Supreme Court cases
United States Supreme Court cases of the Rehnquist Court
Employee Retirement Income Security Act of 1974
2000 in United States case law